Below is a list of languages sorted by writing system (by alphabetical order).

Adlam alphabet

Fulfulde/Pular

Afaka syllabary

Ndyuka (on occasion)

Anatolian alphabets

Anatolian languages (extinct)

Arabic script

Acehnese (on occasion, after the colonization by the Dutch)
Adyghe (before 1927 and Latin script [1927–1938], now uses the Cyrillic script)
Afrikaans (briefly, in the early 19th century)
Arabic
Algerian
Egyptian
Lebanese
Moroccan
Iraqi
Tunisian
and many other varieties of Arabic.

Afar (Kabir Hamza script)
 Arakanese (Only by the Muslims) 
Azerbaijani (Iran only)
Arwi
Bakhtiari
Balochi
Balti
Banjar
Bashkir
Belarusian (on occasion)
Bengali (Historical) (along with Bengali, Sylheti and Assamese script)
Berber
Bhadarwahi
Bosnian (formerly)
Brahui
Burushaski (on occasion)
Central Kurdish
Cham
Chechen (alongside the Georgian script)
Chinese in the Arabic-derived Xiao'erjing alphabet
Chittagonian
Comorian
Crimean Tatar (before 1928)
Dari
Dungan (now uses the Cyrillic script)
Dogri (also uses Devanāgarī in India and Takri script)
Dyula
French in Algeria and other parts of North Africa during the French colonial period.
Filipino used by Muslims from the 14th century to the 16th century, now the Arabic script for Filipino is extinct and is replaced by Spanish in Latin script, which uses the letter Ñ as an extra letter.
Fulani (on occasion)
Gilaki
Greek (on occasion in certain areas of Greece and Anatolia)
Harari (originally, now uses the Ge'ez script)
Hausa (on occasion)
Ingush (at the beginning of the 20th century)
Javanese (see Pegon alphabet)
Jola-Fonyi
Judeo-Arabic languages
Judeo-Tunisian Arabic
Judaeo-Spanish (until the 20th century)
Kanuri (on occasion)
Karakalpak (before 1928)
Kashmiri
Kazakh in China
Khowar
Kurdish (Iran and Iraq)
Kyrgyz
Lak (now uses the Cyrillic script)
Lezgin
Luri
Madurese (with the Pegon alphabet)
Malagasy (until the 19th century)
Malay (14th – 20th century)
Mandinka
Marwari (Pakistan)
Mazanderani
Minangkabau
Mozarabic (now extinct)
Nobiin (alongside Latin script)
Nogai (before 1928 and Latin [1928–1938], now uses the Cyrillic)
Ottoman Turkish (extinct)
Pashto
Persian (Iran and Afghanistan)
Punjabi (Pakistan)
Qashqai
Rohingya (also uses the Latin script)
Salar
Saraiki
Sindhi
Somali (see Wadaad's writing)
Songhay
Spanish (before 16th century, a.k.a. Aljamiado)
Swahili (on occasion)
Tajik (formerly)
Talysh
Tatar
Tausug
Tuareg
Turkish (formerly)
Turkmen (on occasion in Iran and Afghanistan)
Urdu
Uyghur
Uzbek (Formerly, now Cyrillic and Latin are more commonly used)
Wakhi
Wolio
Wolof known as Wolofal
Yoruba in the 17th century with the Ajami script
Zarma (formerly)

Aramaic alphabet

Arabic (see Garshuni)
Assyrian Neo-Aramaic
Bohtan Neo-Aramaic
Chaldean Neo-Aramaic
Hertevin
Koy Sanjaq Surat
Hebrew
Senaya
Syriac
Turoyo (also has new Latin-based script)
Mongolian

Armenian script

Armenian
Western Armenian
Classical Armenian
Middle Armenian

ASL-phabet

Various sign languages
American Sign Language (also si5s, SignWriting, and Stokoe notation)

Borama script

Somali

Brahmic family and derivatives

Bengali–Assamese script

Assamese alphabet:
Assamese
Bishnupriya Manipuri (with Bengali ra)
Bodo (less common now)
Deori
Garo
Kamtapuri
Karbi (formerly)
Khasi
Koch
Rabha
Meitei (officially known as Manipuri) (with Bengali ra)
Mising
Sanskrit
Sylheti
Tiwa
Bengali alphabet
Bengali (Bangla)
Sylheti
Bishnupriya Manipuri (with Assamese va)
Chittagonian
Meitei (officially known as Manipuri) (with Assamese va)
Hajong
Kokborok
Mithilakshara/Tirhuta (Maithili alphabet)
Maithili
Anga Lipi
Angika

Balinese script

Balinese language

Baybayin script

Ilokano (formerly)
Pangasinan (formerly)
Tagalog (formerly)
Bikol language (formerly)
Visayan languages (formerly)

Buhid script

Buhid

Chakma

Chakma

Devanagari

Hindi
Sanskrit
Marathi
Bhojpuri
Magadhi
Maithili
Nepali
Sindhi (also written in Arabic)
Konkani (also written in Latin and Kannada)
Kashmiri (also written in Arabic)
Bodo
Dogri
Santali
Chhattisgarhi
Nepal Bhasa (mainly written in Ranjana Script)

Gujarati script

Gujarati

Hanunó'o script

Hanunó'o

Javanese script (Hanacaraka)

Javanese

Kaithi script

Awadhi
Bhojpuri
Magahi
Maithili

Kannada script

Kannada
Konkani (In Karnataka)
Tulu
Kodava
Badaga (formerly)
Beary bashe (also written in Latin)
Sankethi

Khmer script

Khmer
Pali
Sanskrit

Kulitan alphabet

Kapampangan

Laṇḍā scripts

Gurmukhi script

Punjabi (also written in Shahmukhi, a variant of the Arabic script)

Khojki

Sindhi (formerly)

Khudawadi

Sindhi (formerly)

Mahajani script

Punjabi (formerly)

Multani script

Punjabi (formerly)

Lao script

Lao
Pali (since 1930)

Leke script

Eastern Pwo

Lepcha script

Lepcha

Limbu script

Limbu

Lontara script

Makassarese
Buginese
Mandar

Malayalam script

Malayalam

Meitei Mayek

Meitei (officially known as Manipuri)

Tirhuta/Mithilakshar

Maithili

Modi

Marathi (formerly)

Mongolian

Mongolian

Myanmar script

Burmese
Karen
Geba Karen
Pa-O
Pwo Karen
S'gaw Karen
Mon
Rumai Palaung
Shan
Pali
 Sanskrit

Odia script

Odia
 Sanskrit
 Kui
 Sora
 Kuvi
 Santali
 Chhattisgarhi
 Halbi
 Sambalpuri

'Phags-pa script

Chinese (formerly)
Mongolian (formerly)
Sanskrit (formerly)
Tibetan (for decorative purposes)
Uyghur (formerly)

Ranjana

Nepal Bhasa

Saurashtra

Saurashtra

Sinhala script

Sinhala
Elu
Vedda

Sundanese script

Sundanese

Sylhet Nagri script

Sylheti
Barman Kachari
Bengali dialects (historical)

Tagbanwa script

Palawan languages

Tamil script

Tamil
Badaga
Irula
Kanikkaran
Paniya
Saurashtra

Telugu script

Telugu
Sanskrit
Gondi

Thaana script

Dhivehi (Maldivian)
Malé Latin

Thai script

Thai
Kelantan-Pattani Malay
Pali (since 1893)
 Sanskrit

Tibetan script

Tibetan
Dzongkha
Ladakhi
Sikkimese
Sherpa
Zhang-Zhung (extinct)

Canadian Aboriginal script

Blackfoot
Chipewyan
Cree
Dakelh
Dane-zaa
Inuktitut
Ojibwe
Sekani
Slavey
Tłįchǫ

Caucasian Albanian alphabet

Udi (formerly)

Cherokee script

Cherokee

Coptic alphabet

Coptic language (extinct, still in use liturgically)

Cyrillic script

 Belarusian (also Latin script in the past)
 Bosnian (also Latin script)
 Bulgarian
 Dungan
 Judaeo-Spanish (also Latin script, others)
 Kazakh (to be replaced with Latin script by 2025)
 Kyrgyz
 Macedonian
 Mongolian (also Mongolian script and Latin script)
 Montenegrin (also Latin script in the past)
 Russian
 Serbian (also Latin script, not official)
 Ukrainian
 Persian (Tajikistan and Uzbekistan)

Bosnian Cyrillic alphabet (bosančica)

Croatian (formerly)
Bosnian (formerly)

Ge'ez script (Ethiopia and Eritrea)

Amharic
Ge'ez
Tigrinya
Tigre
Harari
Blin
Me'en (formerly)
Oromo (formerly)

Georgian script

Georgian
Laz (sometimes Latin)
Mingrelian
Svan

Glagolitic alphabet

Old Church Slavonic (extinct, still in use liturgically)
Croatian (formerly)

Gothic alphabet

Gothic (extinct)

Greek script

Greek
Coptic Egyptian
Bactrian (extinct)
Gaulish (extinct) – Written in both Greek and Latin scripts
Judaeo-Spanish (also Latin script)
Karamanli Turkish (extinct)

Chinese characters and derivatives

Sinitic
Mandarin (Dungan uses Cyrillic alphabet)
Yue which includes Cantonese
Wu which includes Shanghainese
Min which includes Taiwanese (most varieties also use Latin alphabet)
Xiang
Hakka
Gan
Jin (sometimes considered part of Mandarin)
Huizhou (sometimes considered part of Wu)
Ping (sometimes considered part of Yue)
 Minority languages in China
Dong
Bai (obsolete)
Miao (obsolete)
Zhuang, with Zhuang logograms
Japanese (kanji plus kana derivative)
Korean (hanja) (used in academic texts and newspapers along with official documents)
Vietnamese (Han-Nom) (used in historic or academic texts, or for artistic or aesthetic purposes, but in general use virtually extinct)
 Extinct languages
 Khitan, written in large and small Khitan scripts
 Jurchen, written in Jurchen script
 Tangut, written in Tangut script

Hangul

Korean
Cia-Cia 
Jeju

Hebrew script

Aramaic (and other writing systems)
Bukhori
Hebrew
Hulaula
Jewish Neo-Aramaic dialect of Urmia
Jewish Neo-Aramaic dialect of Zakho
Judeo-Iraqi Arabic
Judeo-Moroccan
Judeo-Tripolitanian Arabic
Judeo-Tunisian Arabic
Judeo-Portuguese
Judeo-Spanish (originally Rashi script, and other writing systems)
Judeo-Yemenite
Lishanid Noshan
Iranian
Shuadit
Yiddish
Zarphatic

Old Italic script

Italic (extinct)

Kaddare script

Somali

Kana

Japanese (plus kanji)
Ryukyuan (plus kanji)
Ainu slightly modified variety of katakana, which enable the ability to represent final consonants

Kharosthi

Kharosthi (extinct)

Khitan scripts

Khitan (extinct)

Latin script

 Acehnese (also uses the Arabic script)
 Afar (formerly used the Arabic script)
 Afrikaans
 Albanian
 Aragonese
 Asturian
 Aymara
 Azeri (formerly used the Cyrillic script)
 Bai
 Banjar (also uses the Arabic script)
 Basque
 Belarusian (also uses the Cyrillic script, and occasionally the Lacinka alphabet)
 Betawi
 Berber / Tamazight (Algeria, Morocco, Mali, Niger)
 Bislama
 Boholano (formerly used Baybayin)
 Bosnian (also uses the Cyrillic script)
 Breton
 Catalan
 Cebuano
 Chamorro
 Cherokee (also uses the Cherokee script)
 Cornish
 Corsican
 Croatian
 Cree
 Czech
 Danish
 Dayak
 Dutch
 English
 Esperanto
 Estonian
 Faroese
 Fijian
 Finnish
 French
 Fula (Pulaar)
 Gaelic (Scottish)
 Galician
 German
 Gikuyu
 Guaraní
 Haitian Creole
 Hausa (formerly used the Arabic script)
 Hawaiian
 Hiri Motu
 Hmong
 Hungarian
 Icelandic
 Ido
 Igbo
 Ilocano (formerly used Baybayin)
 Indonesian
 Interlingua
 Innu-aimun
 Irish
 Italian
 Javanese (also uses the Javanese script)
 Judeo-Spanish (also used other scripts)
 Kabylian Berber
 Khasi (also uses the Bengali script)
 Kazakh (formerly used the Arabic script; used alongside the Cyrillic script)
 Kinyarwanda
 Klingon language (also uses its own fictional writing system.)
 Kirundi
 Kongo
 Konkani
 Kurdish (Kurmanji)
 Latin
 Latvian
 Laz
 Leonese
 Lingala
 Lithuanian
 Luganda
 Luxembourgish
 Māori
 Malagasy
 Malay (also uses the Arabic script)
 Maltese
 Manx
 Marshallese
 Mauritian Creole
 Min (also uses the Chinese characters)
 Minangkabau (also uses the Arabic script)
 Moldovan (also uses the Cyrillic script)
 Montenegrin (also uses the Cyrillic script)
 Nahuatl (after the Spanish conquest)
 Nauruan
 Navaho or Navajo
 Nias
 Ndebele (Northern)
 Ndebele (Southern)
 North Frisian
 Norwegian
 Occitan
 Oromo (formerly used the Ge'ez script)
 Palauan
 Picard
 Polish
 Portuguese
 Quechua
 Rohingya (formerly used the Arabic script)
 Romanian (formerly used the Romanian Cyrillic alphabet)
 Romansh
 Samoan
 Sasak
 Saterland Frisian
 Scots
 Serbian (officially uses the Cyrillic script)
 Seychellois creole
 Shona
 Slovak
 Slovene
 Somali (formerly used the Arabic script and the Osmanya script)
 Sotho (Northern)
 Sotho (Southern)
 Spanish
 Sundanese (also uses the Sundanese script)
 Swahili
 Swedish
 Swati
 Tagalog (formerly used Baybayin)
 Tahitian
 Tatar (formerly used the Arabic script, then Janalif, and then the Cyrillic script)
 Tetum
 Tok Pisin
 Toki Pona (also uses two logographic writing systems:  and )
 Tongan
 Tsonga
 Tswana
 Tunisian Arabic (also uses the Arabic script)
 Turkish
 Turkmen (formerly used the Cyrillic script)
 Turoyo (formerly used the Syriac alphabet)
 Uzbek (formerly used the Arabic script and then the Cyrillic script; the latter still in widespread use)
 Venda
 Vietnamese (formerly used Han-Nom)
 Vastese
 Volapük
 Võro
 Walloon
 Welsh
 West Frisian
 Wolof
 Xhosa
 Yoruba
 Zazaki
 Zhuang
 Zulu

Meetei Mayek 

 Meitei language (officially known as Manipuri language)

Mesoamerican scripts

Epi-Olmec script

Olmec (extinct)

Maya script

(Almost extinct although still used in some areas)
Achi
Akatek
Awakatek
Chicomuceltec (extinct)
Chontal
Ch'ol
Ch'olti' (extinct)
Ch'orti'
Chuj
Huastec
Itza'
Ixil
Jakaltek
Kaqchikel
Kaqchikel–Kʼicheʼ
Kʼicheʼ
Lacandon
Mam
Mocho'
Mopan
Poqomam
Poqomchiʼ
Q'anjob'al
Q'eqchi'
Sakapultek
Sipakapense
Tektitek
Tojolab'al
Tzeltal
Tzotzil
Tz'utujil
Yucatec

Mixtec script

(Almost extinct although still used in some areas)
Trique
Cuicatec
Mixtec

Nahuat hieroglyphs

(Now uses Spanish alphabet)
Nahuatl

Olmec script

Olmec (extinct)

Zapotec script

 Aloápam Zapotec
 Amatlán Zapotec
 Asunción Mixtepec Zapotec
 Ayoquezco Zapotec
 Cajonos Zapotec
 Chichicápam Zapotec
 Choápam Zapotec
 Coatecas Altas Zapotec
 Santo Domingo Coatlán Zapotec
 El Alto Zapotec
 Elotepec Zapotec
 Guevea Zapotec
 Güilá Zapotec
 Isthmus Zapotec
 Lachiguiri Zapotec
 Lachixío Zapotec
 Lapaguía Zapotec
 Loxicha Zapotec
 Mazaltepec Zapotec
 Miahuatlán Zapotec
 Mitla Zapotec
 San Juan Mixtepec Zapotec
 Ocotlán Zapotec
 Ozolotepec Zapotec
 Petapa Zapotec
 Quiavicuzas Zapotec
 Quioquitani Zapotec
 Rincón Zapotec
 San Agustín Mixtepec Zapotec
 San Baltázar Loxicha Zapotec
 Guelavía Zapotec
 Quiatoni Zapotec
 San Vicente Zapotec
 Santa Catarina Albarradas Zapotec
 Yatzeche Zapotec
 Quiegolani Zapotec
 Xánica Zapotec
 Albarradas Zapotec
 Ixtlán Zapotec
 Yavesía Zapotec
 Rincón Zapotec
 Tabaá Zapotec
 Tejalapan Zapotec
 Texmelucan Zapotec
 Tilquiapan Zapotec
 Tlacolulita Zapotec
 Totomachapan Zapotec
 Xadani Zapotec
 Xanaguía Zapotec
 Yalálag Zapotec
 Ixtlán Zapotec
 Yatee Zapotec
 Yatzachi Zapotec
 San Bartolo Yautepec Zapotec
 Zaachila Zapotec
 Zaniza Zapotec
 Zoogocho Zapotec

Takalik Abaj and Kaminaljuyú scripts

Mixe-Zoquean
Proto-Maya

Mongolian and related scripts

Old Uyghur alphabet

Uyghur (formerly)

Mongolian script

Mongolian (also Cyrillic)

Manchu script

Manchu
Xibe

Munda scripts

Sorang Sompeng

Sora

Ol Cemet'

Santali

Warang Citi

Ho

N'Ko script

N'ko

Naxi script

Naxi (obsolete)

Nsibidi

Ekoi
Igbo
Ibibio

Ogham

Primitive Irish
Pictish
Old Welsh 
British Latin

Osmanya script

Somali

Pahawh Hmong

Hmong

Old Permic alphabet

Komi (formerly)

Runic script

Proto-Norse inscriptions
Old Norse (also Latin script)
Old Danish (also Latin script)
Old English/Anglo-Saxon (also Latin script)
Old Frisian (also Latin script)
Old High German (also Latin script)
Old Dutch (also Latin script)

si5s

Various sign languages
American Sign Language (also ASL-phabet, SignWriting, and Stokoe notation)

SignWriting

Various sign languages
American Sign Language (also, ASL-phabet, si5s, and Stokoe notation)
British Sign Language
Nicaraguan Sign Language

Stokoe notation

Various sign languages
American Sign Language (also, ASL-phabet, si5s, and SignWriting)

Old Turkic script

Old Turkic language (extinct)

Old Hungarian alphabet

Hungarian (revived for decorative purposes only. In use: Latin script)

Tifinagh

Berber / Tamazight (Morocco)
Tuareg

Yezidi script

Yezidi

Yi script

Nuosu

References

 Writing Systme
Languages, list grouped by writing system
Orthographies by script